Rasha Hesham Shurbatji (born 20 April 1975) is a Syrian director; she is known for her works in Syrian and Egyptian drama.

Early life and career 
Rasha Shurbatji was born in Cairo to a Syrian father and an Egyptian mother. Her father, Hesham Shurbatji, was born in 1948. He also was a director. She began her career as an assistant director in family 7 stars in 1997. Her first work was in Qanon wa laken in 2003. Her most famous works were Man of dreams in 2007, Time of Shame in 2009, Ebn Alarandali in 2009, Birth from waist in 2011, Daughters of family in 2012, Private relations in 2015, Samra in 2016, Way in 2018, Prova in 2019.

Personal life 
Rasha Shurbatji was married to a Syrian cinematographer, Naser Alrakka. They separated in September 2012.  In February 2013, she married the Syrian intelligence officer, Tammam Alsaleh Najem Eldin. She became sister-in-law to Suzan Najm Aldeen. They celebrated their Wedding in Dubai in March 2013.

Works 
 Qannon wa laken (2003)
 Khamsa we Khmesa (2003)
 Little Thorns (2005)
 Gazzles in Wolf forest (2006)
 Accident in The way (2007)
 Sons of night (2007)
 Man of Dreams (2007)
 Honor of Opening door (2008)
 Another Raining day (2008)
 Zaman Al'ar (2009)
 Ebn Alarandali (2009)
 Eastern bed (2010)
 Asaad Alwaraq (2010)
 Birth from Side (2011)
 Daughters of family (2012)
 Birth from side 2 (2012)
 Wesh Rajaak (2014)
 Private Relationships (2015)
 Samra (2016)
 Miss (2017)
 Way (2018)
 I cant (2019)
 Prova (2019)

References 

1975 births
Living people
Mass media people from Cairo
Syrian television directors
Syrian people of Egyptian descent